Harold Victor Campbell Thorby (2 October 1888 – 1 January 1973) was an Australian politician. He was a member of the Country Party and served as the party's deputy leader from 1937 to 1940. He represented the Division of Calare (1931–1940) and held ministerial office as Minister for War Service Homes (1934–1936), Defence (1937–1938), Civil Aviation (1938–1939), Health (1940), and Postmaster-General (1940). He lost his seat at the 1940 federal election.

Early life
Thorby was born on 2 October 1888 in Annandale, Sydney, New South Wales. He was the son of Elizabeth (née Campbell) and Frederick James Thorby; his mother was Irish and his father English. Thorby grew up with his maternal grandparents in Geurie and attended the local public school before going on to Sydney Grammar School. He later acquired his own property in Geurie and studied woolclassing, veterinary science and architecture through Sydney Technical College. He also worked as a construction foreman for his father, whose firm had projects in Sydney and Newcastle. In 1916, he married Vera Lynda Morley and they had two daughters.

State politics

Thorby was a member of the three-member electoral district of Wammerawa in the NSW Legislative Assembly from 1922 to 1927 for the Country Party.  After its division into single-member electorates in 1927 he represented Castlereagh for one term to 1930 until his defeat by Joseph Alfred Clark of the Labor Party. He was the Minister for Agriculture and chairman of the Water Conservation and Irrigation Commission in the government of Thomas Bavin from 1927 to 1930, during which construction of the Wyangala Dam commenced, the Burrinjuck Dam was finished and the Hawkesbury Agricultural College was enlarged.

Federal politics

At the 1931 general election, Thorby won the federal  seat of Calare, which he held until 1940.  He was a Minister without Portfolio from November 1934 to November 1937 in the Lyons government, entitled Assistant Minister for Repatriation (1934–35), Minister for War Service Homes (1935–36) and Assistant Minister for Commerce (1935–37). In November 1937, Thorby was elected deputy leader of the Country Party, defeating John McEwen by a single vote on the second ballot. He subsequently served as Minister for Defence from November 1937 to November 1938 and Minister for Works and Minister for Civil Aviation from November 1938.  During this period he initiated a program of adding annexes to existing factories to accelerate armaments production, but this program failed to spend even budgeted funds. In April 1939, he left the ministry when the Country Party refused to take part in the Menzies government.  With the formation of a coalition government in March 1940, Thorby became Minister for Health and Postmaster-General.

Later years
After his defeat at the 1940 election by Labor's John Breen, Thorby ran unsuccessfully for the state seat of Dubbo at the 1941 by-election and the federal seat of Calare at the 1943 and 1946 elections.  He returned to farming on his wife's parents property at Wongarbon and remained active in the Graziers' Association and the Country Party.  Thorby's first wife died in 1958 and he married Alfreda Rogers Smith in 1960.  He died at his home in the Sydney suburb of Wahroonga, survived by two daughters from his first marriage.

References

 

 

 

 

Members of the Cabinet of Australia
1888 births
1973 deaths
Members of the Australian House of Representatives for Calare
Members of the Australian House of Representatives
Members of the New South Wales Legislative Assembly
People educated at Sydney Grammar School
National Party of Australia members of the Parliament of New South Wales
National Party of Australia members of the Parliament of Australia
Defence ministers of Australia
20th-century Australian politicians
Australian Ministers for Health